The 1887 Maryland gubernatorial election took place on November 8, 1887.

Incumbent Democratic Governor Henry Lloyd did not seek re-election.

Democratic candidate Elihu Emory Jackson defeated Republican candidate Walter B. Brooks.

General election

Candidates
Elihu Emory Jackson, Democratic, former State Senator
Walter B. Brooks, Republican, businessman
Summerfield Baldwin, Prohibition, merchant

Results

References

1887
Gubernatorial
Maryland